The following is a list of notable people diagnosed with coeliac disease.

References

Coeliac disease